Tusitala yemenica is a species of jumping spider in the genus Tusitala that lives in Yemen. The female was first identified in 1994 and the male in 2007.

References

Salticidae
Spiders of the Arabian Peninsula
Spiders described in 1994
Taxa named by Wanda Wesołowska